The USA Sevens Rugby Collegiate Championship Invitational, (also now referred to as the 2010 Collegiate Rugby Championship), was a rugby union sevens tournament. The competition was held from 4–6 June at Columbus Crew Stadium in Columbus, Ohio. The CCI was a groundbreaking event in college rugby for several reasons—it was the first ever rugby sevens championship contested among college rugby programs, and it was the first time college rugby was broadcast live on network TV. This was the only year that the tournament was called the "Collegiate Championship Invitational." The following year, the tournament changed its name to the "Collegiate Rugby Championship."

The men's tournament featured sixteen teams, whereas the women's tournament featured eight teams.
The tournament consisted of four round-robin pools of four teams. All sixteen teams progressed to the knockout stage. The top two teams from each group progressed to the quarter-finals in the championship competition. The bottom two teams from each group progressed to the quarter-finals in the challenger competition.

Utah defeated Cal 31-26 in overtime in a thrilling final. Bowling Green's Rocco Mauer led the tournament with 11 tries and was named tournament MVP by Rugby Mag.

Sponsors for the tournament included Subway, Geico, Bud Light and Toyota.

Knockout stage

Notable players
After the conclusion of the tournament, Rugby Mag selected the following 12 players on the All-Tournament team. These players were chosen based on the impact they had made during the tournament and also based on their potential to succeed at higher levels of rugby.

 Blaine Scully - California
 Colin Hawley - California
 Seamus Kelly - California
 Rocco Mauer - Bowling Green
 Nate Ebner - Ohio State
 Will Holder - Army
 Thretton Palamo - Utah
 Don Pati - Utah
 Keegan Engelbrecht - Cal
 Dustin Muhn - Cal
 Duncan Kelm - San Diego State
 Benji Goff - Tennessee

References

External links 
USA Sevens CCI

2010
2010 rugby union tournaments for clubs
2010 in American rugby union
2010 rugby sevens competitions